Softline may refer to:

Softline (South African software company), purchased by the Sage Group
Softline International, a global information technology company
Softline Pastel, accounting software

See also
Softlines, departments in a retail store consisting of textile merchandise, such as clothing, footwear, jewelry, linens and towels; see :Category:Softlines (retail)
Hardline (disambiguation)